The 1919 Lafayette football team was an American football team that represented Lafayette College as an independent during the 1919 college football season. In its first season under head coach Jock Sutherland, the team compiled a 6–2 record. John Weldon was the team captain.  The team played its home games at March Field in Easton, Pennsylvania.

Schedule

References

Lafayette
Lafayette Leopards football seasons
Lafayette football